Tama, or Damut, is the primary language spoken by the Tama people in Ouaddai, eastern Chad and in Darfur, western Sudan. It is a member of the Taman language family. Miisiirii is often considered a dialect, though it is not particularly close.

Demographics
Tama is spoken by 63,000 people in Dar Tama, a well irrigated area near Guéréda that extends from Kebkebiya village to nearby Sudan. There are two nearly identical dialects, one spoken in the northern and central areas, and another one spoken in the south.

References

External links
 Tama basic lexicon at the Global Lexicostatistical Database

Taman languages
Languages of Chad
Languages of Sudan